The Schwerin tramway network is a network of tramways forming the key feature of the public transport system in Schwerin, the capital city of the federal state of Mecklenburg-Vorpommern, Germany.

Lines 
The network's four lines, and their headways during the day (depending in part upon the time of day, or day of week) are:

See also
List of town tramway systems in Germany
Trams in Germany

References

External links

 
 

Schwerin
Transport in Mecklenburg-Western Pomerania
Schwerin
600 V DC railway electrification
Schwerin

https://sgrscrapbook.weebly.com/schwerin-tramway-germany.html